Salehabad (also Romanized as Şāleḩābād) is a village in Qeshlaq-e Jitu Rural District, in the Central District of Qarchak County, Tehran Province, Iran. At the 2006 census, its population was 3,341, in 823 families.

References 

Populated places in Qarchak County